Edwin Raphael is an Indian indie folk musician based in Montreal, Quebec. Raphael moved to Montreal to study at Concordia University from Dubai in 2013. He released his debut EP, Ocean Walk in 2015, which was followed by Cold Nights in 2017. Raphael released his first full-length album, Will You Think of Me Later? in 2019.

His third EP, Staring at Ceilings was released in February 2021 with Dine Alone Records, featuring production efforts from Marcus Paquin, Jacob Liutkus, Andreas Koliakoudakis, and Ishan Parashar.

Edwin began touring in 2022 in support of release from his upcoming album Warm Terracotta which included a headlining Eastern Canadian tour as well as opening slots with Palace, The Franklin Electric, and a performance at Osheaga Festival in the summer of 2022. Raphael's music video for his single, "Have You Been Told?" premiered on Complex on March 15, 2022. 

His sophomore record Warm Terracotta is due out on February 17, 2023, via Dine Alone Records.

In 2022 Edwin Raphael started his own record label, Favourite Library, inspired by secret shows he would curate from his Montreal home.

Discography

Albums
 2019: Will You Think of Me Later?
 2023: Warm Terracotta

Extended Plays
 2015: Ocean Walk
 2017: Cold Nights
 2021: Staring at Ceilings

References 

Living people
Year of birth missing (living people)
Indie folk musicians
English-language musical groups from Quebec